Dwaram Lakshmi is an Indian singer of classical carnatic and Hindustani music. She performs the bhajanas of Meera and Tulasidas and other composers of devotional music.

Career

Dr Lakshmi participated in Radio Sangeetha Sammelan during 2007 and 2008. She has conducted workshops to popularise carnatic music.

Family
Lakshmi is the granddaughter of violinist 'Sangeetha Kalanidhi', Padmasree Dwaram Venkataswamy Naidu and daughter of 'Sangeetha Kalaprapurna'  Dwaram Bhavanarayana Rao and 'Veena Vidushi' Smt. Dwaram Venkata Varadamma. Dwaram Anantha Venkata Swamy, a Civil Engineer working in Visakhapatnam Steel Plant, is her brother. Dr.Dwaram Tyagaraj, her brother is also a very well established singer.

References

External links
 

Women Carnatic singers
Carnatic singers
Living people
Singers from Andhra Pradesh
20th-century Indian singers
People from Nellore
20th-century Indian women singers
Women musicians from Andhra Pradesh
Year of birth missing (living people)